Carole Pankau is a former Republican Illinois State Senator, representing the 23rd district from 2005 to 2013. Pankau previously served as State Representative from 1993 to 2005.

Early life
Pankau earned a B.S. in accounting from the University of Illinois. She served as a member of the DuPage County Board from 1984 to 1992 and prior to that served on the school board for Keeneyville School District 20. She was active as a precinct committeeman in the Republican organization in Bloomingdale Township. In the 1992 general election, Pankau was elected to represent the 45th district.

Illinois General Assembly
In the 1992 general election, Pankau was elected to represent the 45th district. During her tenure, she served on the Committees on Public Health (minority spokesperson); Appropriations III; Environment and Energy; Labor; Revenue. Pankau was a Republican candidate for DuPage County Chairman in 2010 but lost to Republican Daniel Cronin. Pankau lost Senate re-election in 2012 to Tom Cullerton.

Community involvement
Bloomingdale Township Volunteer Council, Past President
DuPage County Health Board member for 4 years
DuPage Housing Authority member for 4 years
“In Focus” Cable TV Program, current hostess since 1992
During the 2008 Republican Party presidential primaries, Pankau worked on behalf of the presidential campaign of former U.S. Senator Fred Thompson serving as a congressional district chair for Illinois's 6th congressional district.

Personal
Pankau was born August 13, 1947 in Valparaiso, Indiana. She has been married to Anthony John Pankau, Jr. since 1966. They have four grown children: John, Jason, Shay and Aaron. She has been a resident of DuPage County for more than 30 years. Pankau was a former owner-manager of an auto-body/towing business for 17 years.

References

External links
Illinois General Assembly - Carole Pankau (R) 23rd District official IL Senate website
Bills, Committees
State Senator Carole Pankau official campaign website
Project Vote Smart - Senator Carole A. Pankau (IL) profile
Follow the Money - Carole Pankau
2006 2004 2002 2000 1998 1996 campaign contributions
Open Secrets - Carole Pankau campaign contributions for her 2006 federal campaign
Illinois State Senate Republicans - Carole Pankau

Republican Party Illinois state senators
Living people
University of Illinois alumni
Republican Party members of the Illinois House of Representatives
Women state legislators in Illinois
1947 births
People from Porter County, Indiana
21st-century American politicians
21st-century American women politicians
County board members in Illinois
School board members in Illinois